Pine Sands is a hamlet in central Alberta, Canada within Sturgeon County.

Demographics 
The population of Pine Sands according to the 2008 municipal census conducted by Sturgeon County is 30.

See also 
List of communities in Alberta
List of hamlets in Alberta

References 

Hamlets in Alberta
Sturgeon County